Gamma Cephei Ab (abbreviated γ Cephei Ab, γ Cep Ab), formally named Tadmor , is an exoplanet approximately 45 light-years away in the constellation of Cepheus (the King). The planet was confirmed to be in orbit around Gamma Cephei A in 2002, but was first suspected to exist around 1988 (making this planet arguably the first true exoplanet discovered).

In July 2014 the International Astronomical Union (IAU) launched NameExoWorlds, a process for giving proper names to certain exoplanets. The process involved public nomination and voting for the new names. In December 2015, the IAU announced the winning name for this planet was Tadmor. It was submitted by the Syrian Astronomical Association and is the ancient Semitic name and modern Arabic name for the city of Palmyra, a (UNESCO) World Heritage Site.

Detection and discovery

1988 claims
The first indications of Gamma Cephei Ab were reported in July 1988. The planet was tentatively identified by a Canadian team of astronomers, which was led by Bruce Campbell, Gordon Walker and Stephenson Yang, while its existence was also announced by Anthony Lawton and P. Wright in 1989. Though not confirmed, this would have been the first true discovery of an extrasolar planet, and it was hypothesized based on the same radial velocity technique later used successfully by others. However, the claim was retracted in 1992 due to the quality of the data not being good enough to make a solid discovery.

2002 confirmation
On 24 September 2002, Gamma Cephei Ab was finally confirmed. The team of astronomers (including William D. Cochran, Artie P. Hatzes, et al.) at the Planetary Systems and their Formation Workshop announced the preliminary confirmation of a long-suspected planet Gamma Cephei Ab with a minimum mass of 1.59 MJ (1.59 times that of Jupiter). The parameters were later recalculated when direct detection of the secondary star Gamma Cephei B allowed astronomers to better constrain the properties of the system. Gamma Cephei Ab moves in an elliptical orbit with a semimajor axis of 2.044 AU which takes almost two-and-a-half years to complete. The eccentricity is 0.115, which means it moves between 1.81 and 2.28 AU in orbital distance around Gamma Cephei A, which would place it from slightly beyond the orbit of Mars, to the inner asteroid belt in the Solar System.

Astrometric observations

Hipparcos data taken in 2006 constrains its mass below "13.3 MJ at the 95% confidence level, and 16.9 MJ at the 99.73% (3 σ) confidence level". This is not much to go on, but it is enough to verify that it is not another unseen brown or red dwarf.

In 2018, Hubble astrometric observations revealed the true mass of Gamma Cephei Ab to be 9.4 .

See also
 51 Pegasi b
 HD 114762 b
 Iota Horologii b
 PSR B1257+12 B
 PSR B1257+12 C

References

External links
 
 

Gamma Cephei
Exoplanets discovered in 1988
Giant planets
Exoplanets with proper names
Exoplanets detected by radial velocity
Exoplanets detected by astrometry